Sundarakanda  was a 2009-2011 Telugu soap opera written & directed by RAJA, that aired on Gemini TV, and dubbed into Tamil and telecasted on Polimer TV and Puthuyugam TV. It was dubbed  in Tamil as Sundarakandam which aired on Polimer TV and as Asoakavanam which aired on Puthuyugam TV.  This is the first South Indian TV serial to be shot in America for 30 days. The show stars Simran, Sujitha, Sai Kiran and Indraja.

Cast
 Simran as Jayashree
 Sujitha as Sneha
 Rishi / Sai Kiran  as Ajay
 Indraja as Pavithra
 Manjula Vijayakumar as Mahalakshmi

Additional cast

 Subhashini/Preeti Nigam as Bhanumathi Devi
 Suresh Krishnamoorthy as Sanjay 
 G. V. Narayana Rao as Bhaskar Rao
 Bhavani as Rajalakshmi 
 Narasimharaju
 Sri Lakshmi
 Priya as Priya
 M.Bakthavatsalam
 Deepika
 Shravan Rajesh as Sriram
 Mahalakshmi as Deepika
Sneha Nambiar as Shalini
 Sumangali as Vaani
 Vivek as Krishna
 Jaya Vahini as Durga
 M.Vasu as Yadagiri
 Mimicri Nageswara Rao
 Gopikar
 Deepa as Ramani
 Sruthi Reddy as Varsha
 Srikar as Arya
 Shireesha as Swathi
 Durga as Swapna
 Sathya Sai as Neelima
 Shareef
 Prabhakar
 Venkatesh

References

External links
 Puthuyugam TV official website 
 Puthuyugam TV on YouTube

Puthuyugam TV television series
Telugu-language television shows